Jack Bell may refer to:

Jack Bell (footballer, born 1869), Scottish footballer (Dumbarton FC, Everton FC, Celtic FC, national team)
Jack Bell (footballer, born 1891), English footballer (Plymouth Argyle, Nottingham Forest)
Jack Bell (footballer, born 1904) (1904–1950), English footballer (Sunderland AFC, Accrington Stanley)

See also 
John Bell (disambiguation), multiple people